Cochylimorpha tamerlana is a species of moth of the family Tortricidae. It is found in Transcaspia and Turkmenistan.

References

Moths described in 1894
Cochylimorpha
Moths of Asia